The following outline is provided as an overview of and topical guide to Grenada:

Grenada – sovereign island nation that comprises the Island of Grenada and the southern Grenadines in the southeastern Caribbean Sea.  Grenada is located north of Trinidad and Tobago and Venezuela, and south of Saint Vincent and the Grenadines.  The national bird of Grenada is the critically endangered Grenada dove.  Popularly known as the "Spice Isle" because of an abundance of locally grown spices and a culture of music, dance and food built into the image of "spice of life", Grenada is also a well-known tourist destination. It is one of the smallest independent nations in the Western Hemisphere.

General reference

 Pronunciation: 
 Common English country name: Grenada
 Official English country name: Grenada
 Common endonym(s):  
 Official endonym(s):  
 Adjectival(s): Grenadian
 Demonym(s):
 Etymology: Name of Grenada
 International rankings of Grenada
 ISO country codes: GD, GRD, 308
 ISO region codes: See ISO 3166-2:GD
 Internet country code top-level domain: .gd

Geography of Grenada 

Geography of Grenada
 Grenada is...
 an island
 a country
 an island country
 a nation state
 a Commonwealth realm
 Location:
 Northern Hemisphere and Western Hemisphere
 North America (though not on the mainland)
 Atlantic Ocean
 North Atlantic
 Caribbean
 Antilles
 Lesser Antilles
 Windward Islands
 Time zone:  Eastern Caribbean Time (UTC-04)
 Extreme points of Grenada
 High:  Mount Saint Catherine 
 Low:  Caribbean Sea 0 m
 Land boundaries:  none
 Coastline:  121 km
 Population of Grenada: 106,000  – 185th most populous country

 Area of Grenada: 344 km2
 Atlas of Grenada

Environment of Grenada 

 Climate of Grenada
 Renewable energy in Grenada
 Geology of Grenada
 Protected areas of Grenada
 Biosphere reserves in Grenada
 National parks of Grenada
 Wildlife of Grenada
 Fauna of Grenada
 Birds of Grenada
 Mammals of Grenada

Natural geographic features of Grenada 

 Fjords of Grenada
 Glaciers of Grenada
 Islands of Grenada
 Lakes of Grenada
 Mountains of Grenada
 Volcanoes in Grenada
 Rivers of Grenada
 Waterfalls of Grenada
 Valleys of Grenada
 World Heritage Sites in Grenada: None

Regions of Grenada 

Regions of Grenada

Ecoregions of Grenada 

List of ecoregions in Grenada

Administrative divisions of Grenada 
None

Municipalities of Grenada 

 Capital of Grenada: St. George's
 Cities of Grenada

Demography of Grenada 

Demographics of Grenada

Government and politics of Grenada 

 Form of government: parliamentary representative democratic monarchy
 Capital of Grenada: St. George's
 Elections in Grenada
 Political parties in Grenada

Branches of the government of Grenada 

Government of Grenada

Executive branch of the government of Grenada 
 Head of state: King of Grenada, represented by the Governor-General of Grenada
 Head of government: Prime Minister of Grenada,
 Cabinet of Grenada

Legislative branch of the government of Grenada 

 Parliament of Grenada (bicameral)
 Upper house: Senate of Grenada
 Lower house: House of Representatives of Grenada

Judicial branch of the government of Grenada 

Court system of Grenada
 Supreme Court of Grenada

Foreign relations of Grenada 

Foreign relations of Grenada
 Diplomatic missions in Grenada
 Diplomatic missions of Grenada

International organization membership 
Grenada is a member of:

African, Caribbean, and Pacific Group of States (ACP)
Agency for the Prohibition of Nuclear Weapons in Latin America and the Caribbean (OPANAL)
Caribbean Community and Common Market (Caricom)
Caribbean Development Bank (CDB)
Commonwealth of Nations
Food and Agriculture Organization (FAO)
Group of 77 (G77)
International Bank for Reconstruction and Development (IBRD)
International Civil Aviation Organization (ICAO)
International Criminal Police Organization (Interpol)
International Development Association (IDA)
International Federation of Red Cross and Red Crescent Societies (IFRCS)
International Finance Corporation (IFC)
International Fund for Agricultural Development (IFAD)
International Labour Organization (ILO)
International Maritime Organization (IMO)
International Monetary Fund (IMF)
International Olympic Committee (IOC)

International Red Cross and Red Crescent Movement (ICRM)
International Telecommunication Union (ITU)
International Trade Union Confederation (ITUC)
Multilateral Investment Guarantee Agency (MIGA)
Nonaligned Movement (NAM)
Organisation for the Prohibition of Chemical Weapons (OPCW)
Organization of American States (OAS)
Organization of Eastern Caribbean States (OECS)
United Nations (UN)
United Nations Conference on Trade and Development (UNCTAD)
United Nations Educational, Scientific, and Cultural Organization (UNESCO)
United Nations Industrial Development Organization (UNIDO)
Universal Postal Union (UPU)
World Federation of Trade Unions (WFTU)
World Health Organization (WHO)
World Intellectual Property Organization (WIPO)
World Trade Organization (WTO)

Law and order in Grenada 

Law of Grenada
 Cannabis in Grenada
 Constitution of Grenada
 Crime in Grenada
 Human rights in Grenada
 LGBT rights in Grenada
 Freedom of religion in Grenada
 Law enforcement in Grenada

Military of Grenada 

Military of Grenada
 Command
 Commander-in-chief:
 Ministry of Defence of Grenada
 Forces
 Army of Grenada
 Navy of Grenada
 Air Force of Grenada
 Special forces of Grenada
 Military history of Grenada
 Military ranks of Grenada

Local government in Grenada 

Local government in Grenada

History of Grenada 

History of Grenada
Timeline of the history of Grenada
Current events of Grenada
 Military history of Grenada

Culture of Grenada 

Culture of Grenada
 Architecture of Grenada
 Cuisine of Grenada
 Festivals in Grenada
 Languages of Grenada
 Media in Grenada
List of newspapers in Grenada
 National symbols of Grenada
 Coat of arms of Grenada
 Flag of Grenada
 National anthem of Grenada
 People of Grenada
 Public holidays in Grenada
 Records of Grenada
 Religion in Grenada
 Christianity in Grenada
 Hinduism in Grenada
 Islam in Grenada
 Judaism in Grenada
 Sikhism in Grenada
 World Heritage Sites in Grenada: None

Art in Grenada 
 Art in Grenada
 Cinema of Grenada
 Literature of Grenada
 Music of Grenada
 Television in Grenada
 Theatre in Grenada

Sports in Grenada 

Sports in Grenada
 Football in Grenada
 Grenada at the Olympics

Economy and infrastructure of Grenada 

Economy of Grenada
 Economic rank, by nominal GDP (2007): 174th (one hundred and seventy fourth)
 Agriculture in Grenada
 Banking in Grenada
 National Bank of Grenada
 Communications in Grenada
 Internet in Grenada
 Companies of Grenada
Currency of Grenada: Dollar
ISO 4217: XCD
 Energy in Grenada
 Energy policy of Grenada
 Oil industry in Grenada
 Mining in Grenada
 Tourism in Grenada
 Visa policy of Grenada
 Transport in Grenada
 Grenada Stock Exchange

Education in Grenada 

Education in Grenada

Infrastructure of Grenada
 Health care in Grenada
 Transportation in Grenada
 Airports in Grenada
 Rail transport in Grenada
 Roads in Grenada

See also

Grenada
Index of Grenada-related articles
List of Grenada-related topics
List of international rankings
Member state of the Commonwealth of Nations
Member state of the United Nations
Monarchy of Grenada
Outline of geography
Outline of North America
Outline of the Caribbean

References

External links
 
 Rural poverty in Grenada (IFAD)
 
 grenadaisland.com
Official Website of the Government of Grenada
The Grenada Revolution online
Brief History of Grenada
Presentation Brothers College
The Lost Bishop Photos

Grenada
Grenada